Lag da Pigniu (or Panixer Stausee) is a reservoir above Pigniu (Panix) in the Grisons, Switzerland. The 53 m gravity dam was completed in 1989. It is operated by Kraftwerke Ilanz AG.

See also
List of lakes of Switzerland
List of mountain lakes of Switzerland

External links
Swiss dams: Panix

Reservoirs in Switzerland
Lakes of Graubünden
Ilanz/Glion